Areva albogrisea is a moth of the subfamily Arctiinae. It was described by Rothschild in 1912. It is found in Ecuador.

References

Moths described in 1912
Lithosiini
Moths of South America